Harden City is an unincorporated community in Pontotoc County, Oklahoma, United States. The community is located 11 miles south of Ada. It was named after community resident Andrew Harden.

References

Unincorporated communities in Pontotoc County, Oklahoma
Unincorporated communities in Oklahoma